This is a rank comparison chart of air force officer ranks of African states.

Officers

Warrant officers

See also
Comparative air force officer ranks of the Americas
Ranks and insignia of NATO air forces officers

References

Military comparisons